The  is a constituency that represents Ibaraki Prefecture in the House of Councillors in the Diet of Japan. It has four Councillors in the 242-member house.

Outline
The constituency represents the entire population of Ibaraki Prefecture. The district elects four Councillors to six-year terms, two each at alternating elections held every three years. The district has 2,411,307 registered voters as of September 2015. The Councillors currently representing Ibaraki are:
 Akira Gunji (Democratic Party, third term; term ends in 2016)
 Hiroshi Okada (Liberal Democratic Party (LDP), third term; term ends in 2016)
 Yukihisa Fujita (Democratic Party, second term; term ends in 2019)
 Ryosuke Kouzuki (LDP, first term; term ends in 2019)

Elected Councillors

Election results

See also
List of districts of the House of Councillors of Japan
Ibaraki 4th district, one of seven districts that represents Ibaraki Prefecture in the House of Representatives

References 

Districts of the House of Councillors (Japan)